Drögen is a lake in Kinda and Linköping municipalities, Östergötland County in southeastern Sweden. The lake lies in sparsely populated area and is mostly surrounded by forests. Common fish in the lake are Eurasian perch, northern pike, common bleak, vendace, burbot, tench, common bream and roach. Occasionally European eel can be found while the local population of Arctic char has gone extinct.

References

Kinda Municipality
Linköping Municipality
Östergötland
Lakes of Östergötland County